The Faisalabad women's cricket team is the women's representative cricket team for Faisalabad. They competed in the National Women's Cricket Championship between 2004–05 and 2017.

History
Faisalabad joined the National Women's Cricket Championship for its inaugural season in 2004–05, being eliminated in the initial knock-out round to Multan. The side went on to compete in every edition of the National Women's Cricket Championship until it ended in 2017, but never made it out of the group stages. Their best finish came in 2017, when they topped Group C and then finished 3rd in the Super League round of the competition.

Players

Notable players
Players who played for Faisalabad and played internationally are listed below, in order of first international appearance (given in brackets):

 Sadia Yousuf (2008)
 Sadia Iqbal (2019)

Seasons

National Women's Cricket Championship

Honours
 National Women's Cricket Championship:
 Winners (0):
 Best finish: 3rd (2017)

See also
 Faisalabad cricket team

References

Women's cricket teams in Pakistan
Cricket in Faisalabad